Tanbakukar may refer to:
 Tanbakukar, Seyyedvaliyeddin